Decaisne is a surname. Notable people with the surname include:

 Henri Decaisne (1799–1852), Belgian historical and portrait painter
 Joseph Decaisne (1807–1882), French botanist and agronomist